52nd Miss Korea 2008 was a beauty pageant held on July 8, 2008 at Sejong Center, sponsored by the Korean newspaper Hankook Ilbo. Approximately 51 women from around the world competed in Seoul, South Korea and seven were selected by a panel of judges. The first-place winner was Na Ree, crowned by the official last year winner Lee Ji-sun. Na Ree was to compete at Miss Universe 2009 in the Bahamas.

Results

Placements

References

External links
 Miss Korea's Official Website
 Miss Korea 2008 Contestants
 

2008
2008 in South Korea
2008 beauty pageants